New York City's 40th City Council district is one of 51 districts in the New York City Council. It has been represented by Democrat Rita Joseph since 2022. She succeeded term-limited Mathieu Eugene, who unsuccessfully ran for Brooklyn Borough President in 2021.

Geography
District 40 covers a series of majority-Black neighborhoods near the geographical center of Brooklyn, including all of Prospect Lefferts Gardens, most of Flatbush, and parts of East Flatbush, Crown Heights, Kensington, and Midwood. The Prospect Park Parade Ground is also located within the district.

The district overlaps with Brooklyn Community Boards 9, 12, 14, and 17, and with New York's 9th and 10th congressional districts. It also overlaps with the 17th, 20th, and 21st districts of the New York State Senate, and with the 42nd, 43rd, and 44th districts of the New York State Assembly.

Recent election results

2021
In 2019, voters in New York City approved Ballot Question 1, which implemented ranked-choice voting in all local elections. Under the new system, voters have the option to rank up to five candidates for every local office. Voters whose first-choice candidates fare poorly will have their votes redistributed to other candidates in their ranking until one candidate surpasses the 50 percent threshold. If one candidate surpasses 50 percent in first-choice votes, then ranked-choice tabulations will not occur.

2017

2013

References

New York City Council districts